Mary Healy (May 14, 1953 – August 7, 2014) was the CEO and director of the Sacramento Zoo.

Healy was director of the zoo since December 1999. Her career began as a bird keeper for the Riverbanks Zoo in South Carolina. The Sacramento Business Journal awarded Healy the Women Who Mean Business award in 2013. 

She died of a cerebral aneurysm and heart attack at the age of 61 on a trip to the Galápagos Islands.

References

1953 births
2014 deaths
American zoologists
Deaths from intracranial aneurysm
Disease-related deaths in Ecuador
Place of birth missing